This article shows the rosters of all participating teams at the women's indoor volleyball tournament at the 2016 Summer Olympics in Rio de Janeiro.

Pool A

Argentina
The following is the Argentine roster in the women's volleyball tournament of the 2016 Summer Olympics.

Head coach: Guillermo Orduna

Brazil
The following is the Brazilian roster in the women's volleyball tournament of the 2016 Summer Olympics.

Head coach: José Roberto Guimarães

Cameroon
The following was the Cameroonian roster in the women's volleyball tournament of the 2016 Summer Olympics.

Head coach: Jean-René Akono

Japan
The following is the Japanese roster in the women's volleyball tournament of the 2016 Summer Olympics.

Head coach: Masayoshi Manabe

Russia
The following is the Russian roster in the women's volleyball tournament of the 2016 Summer Olympics.

Head coach: Yuri Marichev

South Korea
The following is the South Korean roster in the women's volleyball tournament of the 2016 Summer Olympics.

Head coach: Lee Jung-chul

Pool B

China
The following is the Chinese roster in the women's volleyball tournament of the 2016 Summer Olympics.

Head coach: Lang Ping

Italy
The following is the Italian roster in the women's volleyball tournament of the 2016 Summer Olympics.

Head coach: Marco Bonitta

Netherlands
The following is the Dutch roster in the women's volleyball tournament of the 2016 Summer Olympics.

Head coach: Giovanni Guidetti

Puerto Rico
The following is the Puerto Rican roster  in the women's volleyball tournament of the 2016 Summer Olympics.

Head coach: Juan Carlos Núñez

Serbia
The following is the Serbian roster in the women's volleyball tournament of the 2016 Summer Olympics.

Head coach: Zoran Terzić

United States
The following is the American roster in the women's volleyball tournament of the 2016 Summer Olympics.

Head coach: Karch Kiraly

See also
Volleyball at the 2016 Summer Olympics – Men's team rosters

References

External links

2016
Women's team rosters
2016 in women's volleyball
Vol